Choi Min-ho (Hangul: 최민호; born 27 June 1980) is a South Korean badminton player. Choi who educated at the Icheon high school competed at the 1998 World Junior Championships, won a silver in the mixed doubles and a bronze in the boys' doubles events. At the young age, Choi clinched the senior international tournament for the first time at the 1997 Korea International in the mixed doubles event partnered with Lee Hyo-jung. He won double titles at the 1998 Sri Lanka International, winning the men's and mixed doubles event.

Choi trained at the Gimcheon city, graduated from the Inha University, and was a former South Korea national team coach.

In February 2022, Choi was he was hired to join Chinese national team coaching staff as men's double coach alongside fellow South Korean Coach Kang, who extended his contract as women's double coach.

Achievements

World Junior Championships 
Boys' doubles

Mixed doubles

BWF International Challenge/Series 
Men's doubles

Mixed doubles

  BWF International Challenge tournament
  BWF International Series tournament

References

External links 
 

1980 births
Living people
South Korean male badminton players
Badminton coaches